Isaac Parsons (January 27, 1752 – August 25, 1796) was an American slave owner, politician, and militia officer in the U.S. state of Virginia (now West Virginia). Parsons served as a member of the Virginia House of Delegates representing Hampshire County from 1789 until his death in 1796. Following an act of the Virginia General Assembly in 1789, Parsons was appointed to serve as a trustee for the town of Romney. In 1790, Parsons began serving as a justice for Hampshire County. He served as a captain in command of a company in the Virginia militia during the American Revolutionary War and continued to serve as a captain in the Hampshire County militia following the war. Parsons operated a public ferry across the South Branch Potomac River, and later died from drowning in the river in 1796. Parsons was the grandfather of Isaac Parsons (1814–1862), who also represented Hampshire County in the Virginia House of Delegates and served as an officer in the Confederate States Army.

Early life and family 
Isaac Parsons was born on January 27, 1752, in Hampshire County, Virginia (now West Virginia). Parsons was the third son of Thomas Parsons and his wife Parthenia Baldwin (also spelled Bayldwin) Parsons. The Parsons family was a prominent family whose ancestors arrived to the Thirteen Colonies from England in 1635 and relocated to Hampshire County around 1740. Parsons' father settled on the Eastern Shore of Maryland in 1725 prior to relocating to Hampshire County, Virginia.

Landholdings 
Following the death of his father Thomas Parsons between the date of his will and testament on May 27, 1771, and his will's recording on March 10, 1772, Parsons inherited a plantation on Lot Number 16 of the "South Branch Survey" of Thomas Fairfax, 6th Lord Fairfax of Cameron's Northern Neck Proprietary and other valuable lands in Hampshire County and in the present-day counties of Hardy and Grant. Parsons and his brother Baldwin also received land their father had acquired from Luke Collins, which was divided between Parsons and his brother by Nathaniel Kuykendall, John Foreman, and William Foreman. By 1778, Parsons owned  of Lot Number 16 and all of Lot Number 17 of Lord Fairfax's "South Branch Survey".

By 1790, Parsons also owned the corner of Lot Number 1 within the town of Romney. In 1795, Parsons acquired an additional  along the South Branch Potomac River. Parsons' Lot 16 property along the South Branch Potomac River was later purchased by David Gibson in 1836, after which Gibson established his Sycamore Dale plantation there.

Ferry service 
Parsons petitioned the Virginia General Assembly to establish a public ferry across the South Branch Potomac River, thus connecting his property on both sides of the river. In October 1786, the Virginia General Assembly passed an act establishing the public ferry at Parsons' property near the present site of the U.S. Route 50 bridge west of Romney. The assembly's act set the ferry's toll at three pence and three farthings per man, and the same price per horse. By 1790, Parsons was continuing the operation of the ferry, which had become known as "Parson's Ferry". On December 26, 1792, the Virginia General Assembly passed an additional act for the settlement and regulation of public ferries. The assembly's act mandated that Parsons' ferry be "constantly kept" at its location, and established its toll amounting to six cents per man, and six cents per horse.

Political and military careers 
During the American Revolutionary War, Parsons served as a captain in command of a company under the charge of Major Vincent Williams in the Virginia militia. By December 11, 1788, Parsons was again serving as a captain in command of a company in the Hampshire County militia.

Parsons served as a member of the Virginia House of Delegates representing Hampshire County from 1789 until his death on August 25, 1796. Parsons represented Hampshire County, which was a multi-member electoral district, in the Virginia House of Delegates. During the October 19 – December 19, 1789, session, Parsons served alongside Elias Poston and Isaac Miller. In the sessions between 1790 and 1793, Parsons served alongside Elias Poston. Parsons served alongside Francis White during the 1794 session. During the 1795 session, he again served alongside Elias Poston. Parsons died on August 25, 1796, before the November 8 – December 27, 1796, session of the Virginia House of Delegates, where he was to have served alongside Alexander King. Parsons' seat was filled by Fielding Calmes, who served out Parsons' term during this session. During his final two sessions in the Virginia House of Delegates in 1794 and 1795, Parsons was a member of the Federalist Party.

By February 14, 1788, Parsons had been appointed as an appraiser of property in Hampshire County by an act of the Virginia General Assembly. On December 4, 1789, Parsons was again appointed by an act of the Virginia General Assembly to serve as a trustee of the town of Romney. Parsons served as a trustee alongside Isaac Miller, Andrew Wodrow, Stephen Colvin, Jonathan Purcell, Nicholas Casey, William McGuire, Perez Drew and James Murphy. Parsons and his fellow trustees were given authority by the Virginia General Assembly to settle disputes regarding the town's land lots and to "open and clear" the town's "streets and lanes" in accordance with the original survey and plan for Romney. In 1790, Parsons was either elected or appointed as a justice for Hampshire County alongside Jonathan Purcell, James Martin, Cornelius Ferrel, Edward McCarty, Solomon Jones, and Elias Poston. Parsons died on August 25, 1796; according to tradition, he died from drowning in the South Branch Potomac River.

Personal life 
Parsons was married on April 23, 1772, to Mary E. Ellender Gregg. Mary E. Ellender Gregg was born on February 27, 1756. Parsons and his wife had two sons: James Gregg Parsons (1773–1847), married to Mary Catherine Casey in 1795, and David Parsons (1775-1857), married to Catherine Miller.

References

Bibliography

 
 
 
 
 
 
 
 
 
 
 
 
 
 
 

1752 births
1796 deaths
18th-century American landowners
18th-century American politicians
Accidental deaths in West Virginia
American people of English descent
American planters
American slave owners
Deaths by drowning in the United States
Farmers from Virginia
Farmers from West Virginia
Members of the Virginia House of Delegates
Military personnel from West Virginia
Parsons, Isaac 01
People from Romney, West Virginia
Trustees of populated places in Virginia
Virginia Federalists
Virginia militiamen in the American Revolution
West Virginia colonial people